Amahai Airport is an airport in Amahai, Indonesia.

Amahai is located on the south coast of the island of Seram, near the city of Masohi, and on the east side of the Elpaputih Bay.

Airlines and destinations

References

Airports in Maluku